Daniel Tornado Sibandze (born 28 January 1964) is a Swazi long-distance runner. He competed in the men's marathon at the 1996 Summer Olympics.

References

External links
 

1964 births
Living people
Athletes (track and field) at the 1996 Summer Olympics
Swazi male long-distance runners
Swazi male marathon runners
Olympic athletes of Eswatini
Place of birth missing (living people)